() is a Japanese technique of assembling wooden pieces without the use of nails.

Method 
Thinly slit wooden pieces are grooved, punched and mortised, and then fitted individually using a plane, saw, chisel and other tools to make fine adjustments. The technique was developed in Japan in the Asuka Era (600–700 AD).  panels slot together and remain in place through pressure alone, and that pressure is achieved through meticulously calculating, cutting, and arranging interweaving joints. The end result is a complex pattern that is used primarily in the creation of shoji doors and screens. Traditionally, the wood of choice was the hinoki cypress.

Patterns 
The designs for  pieces aren't chosen randomly. Many of the nearly 200 patterns used today have been around since the Edo era (1603–1868). Each design has a meaning or is mimicking a pattern in nature that is thought to be a good omen. The patterns are designed to look good, but also to distribute light and wind in a calming and beautiful way.

See also

Reference 

Japanese woodwork
Woodworking techniques